Baba Darbara Singh (1644–1734) was second Jathedar of Khalsa Panth Dal Khalsa. He should not be confused with other Darbara Singh of Sirhind who fought in Battle of Anandpur. 

Darbara Singh was born in the village of Dal as the son of Bhai Nanu Singh from Dilwali of Delhi and had a brother name Gharbara singh , they belonged to the family of Guru Hargobind. He served Guru Gobind Singh for 16 years. He died at age of 90 and succeeded by Nawab Kapur Singh.

References

Nihang
1643 births
1733 deaths
Punjabi people
Jathedars of Akal Takht